Frances Lawrence may refer to:
The widow of British murder victim Philip Lawrence, who founded the Philip Lawrence Awards in his memory
The real name of the title character in the 1960s TV series Gidget

See also
Francis Lawrence (disambiguation)